Zoubida Laayouni (born 5 February 1956) is a retired Moroccan athlete who specialised in the discus throw. She won eight medals at the African Championships in Athletics including record six gold medals.

Her personal best in the event is 56.94 metres set in Meknès in 1994. This is the still standing national record.

Competition record

1Representing Africa

References

1956 births
Living people
Moroccan female discus throwers
Athletes (track and field) at the 1979 Mediterranean Games
Athletes (track and field) at the 1983 Mediterranean Games
Athletes (track and field) at the 1987 Mediterranean Games
Athletes (track and field) at the 1991 Mediterranean Games
Athletes (track and field) at the 1993 Mediterranean Games
Mediterranean Games competitors for Morocco
20th-century Moroccan women
21st-century Moroccan women